Armand Ossey (born 19 October 1978 in Libreville, Gabon), is a former Gabonese international football striker who played between 1995 and 2008. During his career he played in Gabon as well as in France, Portugal and in Estonia in which his previous clubs include CS Stade d'Akebe Libreville, Grenoble, Valence, Créteil, Moreirense, Pau, Rouen, Kuressaare and Paris. He participated in the 2000 African Nations Cup for Gabon in 2000 in which Gabon finished in last place with one point. Armand Ossey played for Gabon between 1998 and 2000.

External links

1978 births
Living people
Gabonese footballers
Gabon international footballers
Gabonese expatriate footballers
2000 African Cup of Nations players
Ligue 2 players
Grenoble Foot 38 players
ASOA Valence players
US Créteil-Lusitanos players
Moreirense F.C. players
Pau FC players
FC Rouen players
Paris FC players
Expatriate footballers in France
Expatriate footballers in Portugal
Sportspeople from Libreville
Association football forwards
21st-century Gabonese people